Mike Moser is an American politician

Personal life
Moser was born on September 18, 1951 in Fremont, Nebraska. He is married to Jan Moser.

Education
Moser graduated from Scotus Central Catholic High School in Columbus, Nebraska, in 1969. He earned his associate degree at Central Community college and graduated from University of Nebraska-Lincoln in 1975 with a bachelor's degree.

Career
Moser was mayor of Columbus from 2004 to 2016. In 2010, he tried to run for state senator in Nebraska's 22nd district. He won the primary and lost the general election to Paul Schumacher.

He ran for state senator in the same district eight years later as his predecessor was unable to run again due to term limits. Moser easily won that election with 64.3% of the votes against Doug Oertwich. He was sworn in as senator on January 9, 2019.

On May 25, 2020, Moser was hospitalized due to COVID-19.

Electoral history

References

21st-century American politicians
Republican Party Nebraska state senators
1951 births
Living people